Raymond Mason may refer to:

 Raymond Mason (sculptor)
 Raymond A. Mason, CEO of Legg Mason
 Raymond K. Mason, businessman
 Raymond Mason (actor), see The Kipper and the Corpse